= Kampung Sungai Bedaun =

Kampung Sungai Bedaun is a village in Federal Territory of Labuan, Malaysia.
